Afrokona is a monotypic genus of moths in the family Sesiidae. The only species is Afrokona aerea.

References

Sesiidae